Mirosława Kazimiera Sarna (née Sałacińska; born 8 June 1942) is a Polish former track and field athlete who competed in the long jump, short sprints and the women's pentathlon. She was the gold medallist in the long jump at the 1969 European Athletics Championships and was twice a bronze medallist in that discipline at the European Athletics Indoor Championships.

An 8-time Polish national champion, she represented her country at the 1968 Summer Olympics.

Career
Sarna was born in Łódź to Stefana Sałacińska and Józef Sałaciński and studied at the city's XVIII high school. She took up track and field in her youth, joining the Ogniwa athletics club in 1955 and made her international debut for Poland in 1959. She continued to study during this period and ultimately gained a master's degree in physical education. She married her coach, Edmund Sarna, in 1968 and began competing under her married from that point onwards.

Sarna's first national title was in the long jump in 1964 and her performance of  equalled the championship record. After that she had a national win in the women's pentathlon in 1966, amassing a score of 4332 points. She was chosen to represent Poland in that event at the 1966 European Athletics Championships and placed 15th. After a win in the 200 metres at the Polish Athletics Championships in 1967, she transitioned into a sprint and long jump specialist. A second Polish long jump title in 1968 gained her selection for the 1968 Mexico City Olympics, being one of two Polish entrants alongside Irena Szewińska. She achieved a personal best there, recording  to take fifth place in the final.

The 1969 season proved to be the best of Sarna's career. She won a 200 metres/long jump double at the national championships. She was entered in three events for the 1969 European Athletics Championships in Athens: the long jump, 100 metres and the 4 × 100 metres relay. She reached the semi-finals of the 100 m and ran the anchor leg of the relay to bring the team of Krystyna Mandecka, Danuta Jędrejek and Urszula Jóźwik to fifth in the final.

The runner-up, Heide Rosendahl, succeeded Sarna as European champion a year later. The quality of the competition was not as high at the 1973 European Athletics Indoor Championships and despite only having a mark of  she was again third on the podium, this time behind Diana Yorgova and Jarmila Nygrýnová. She also ran in the 60 metres at the 1970 edition, placing fifth.

Sarna's final national titles came in the 1973 season when she was Poland's long jump champion both indoors and outdoors. Her indoor winning mark of  remained the championship record until 1978, when it was improved by Anna Włodarczyk. Sarna made the last of her 47 international appearances in the 1973 season. After retiring from the sport, she went into education as a coach and physical education teacher.

National titles
Polish Athletics Championships
200 m: 1967, 1969
Long jump: 1964, 1968, 1969, 1973
Pentathlon: 1966
Polish Indoor Championships
Long jump: 1973

International competitions

See also
List of European Athletics Championships medalists (women)

References

Living people
1942 births
Sportspeople from Łódź
Polish female long jumpers
Polish female sprinters
Polish pentathletes
Olympic athletes of Poland
Athletes (track and field) at the 1968 Summer Olympics
European Athletics Championships medalists
Universiade silver medalists in athletics (track and field)
Universiade silver medalists for Poland